Friedrich Wilhelm Schubert (20 May 1799 in Königsberg – 21 July 1868 in Königsberg) was a German historian.

He studied at the universities of Königsberg and Berlin, becoming an associate professor at Königsberg in 1823. In 1826 he was named a full professor of medieval and modern history and of constitutional law at the university.

He was a member of the Frankfurt National Assembly and Erfurt Union Parliament. He held a seat in the Prussian Lower Chamber (1849–52, 1858–63) and from 1864 onward, represented the University of Königsberg at the Prussian House of Lords.

Published works 
With Karl Rosenkranz, he edited the works of Immanuel Kant, Immanuel Kant's Sämmtliche Werke (12 volumes, 1838–42). Among his other writings are the following:
 Handbuch der Allgemeinen Staatskunde von Europa (2 volumes, 1835–48) –  Handbook on general citizenship of Europe.
 Die Verfassungsurkunden und Grundgesetze der Staaten Europa's, der Nordamerikanischen Freistaaten und Brasiliens (2 volumes, 1848) – The constitutional and principal laws of the states of Europe, the North American Free States and Brazil.

References 

1799 births
1868 deaths
University of Königsberg alumni
Academic staff of the University of Königsberg
19th-century German historians
German medievalists
Members of the Prussian House of Lords